Leutershausen is a municipality in the district of Ansbach, in Bavaria, Germany. It is situated on the river Altmühl, 12 km west of Ansbach.

History
Leutershausen was probably founded by Frankish settlers around 800. For the first time it is referred to in a privilege of Emperor Otto III as "Liuthereshusunin" in 1000.

On the 19th of April, 1945, the village was almost completely destroyed by Allied fighter-bombers (Veeh, 'Kriegsfurie', pp. 452, 457-461; Woller, 'Gesellschaft und Politik in der amerikanischen Besatzungszone: Die Region Ansbach und Fürth', pp. 55-56)

Sport
Leutershausen has a sportsclub, called TV 1862 Leutershausen. As said in the name it was founded in 1862 and has since organised sport events at the local stadium and provides training in seven different disciplines, the biggest being football and athletics. Furthermore, there are table tennis, tennis, gymnastics, triathlon and ball game departments. 
In June 2012 there was a big celebration weekend due to the 150th anniversary of the TV Leutershausen including the traditional Maikränzchen athletics competition and Public Viewing of the 2012 Euros.

Sights
St. Peter's Church
Historic citywall
Historic County Court Building
Gustave Whitehead Museum
Gustave Whitehead Memorial
Museum of local history
Leutershausen has restored one of its pre-war synagogues.

International relations

Since 2000 Leutershausen is twinned with the Hungarian town of Szendrö.

Famous people
 Gustave Whitehead, German-American aviation pioneer
 Christopher McNaughton, German basketball player, playing for the German national team
 Paula Kissinger (née Stern), mother of American Secretary of State and Nobel Prize recipient Henry Kissinger

References

External links

 Gustave Whitehead Museum (German)
 Gustave Whitehead's Flying Machines
 Air Sports International — Did He Actually Fly Before The Wright Brothers?
 History Net — Gustave Whitehead and the First-Flight Controversy
Wright Brothers Aeroplane Company
 The History of Lordship! at www.lordshiphistory.com
 Flight Journal magazine, "The Who Flew First Debate" Oct 1998  by O'Dwyer, William J.
 Gustave Whitehead: The Viking of Flight
 The Pioneers, Gustav Weißkopf links
 Voices of several persons mentioned in the article

Ansbach (district)